The Associated Independent Colleges, or AIC, is a group of independent secondary schools in south-east Queensland, Australia. With the exception of St Peters Lutheran College, AIC schools are all-boys schools (St Peter's secondary girls compete in the Queensland Girls' Secondary Schools Sports Association).

The AIC was founded in 1998 as an athletic association for male secondary students. All eight colleges were formerly members of The Associated Schools (TAS), founded in 1956. Some colleges were originally members of the Metropolitan Catholic Schools Association (MCSA), founded in 1934. The most prominent sports contested include rugby union, cricket and football, as well as swimming and track and field.

History
The Associated Independent Colleges was formed in 1998 with the first year of competition being 1999. All AIC members were previously in The Associated Schools (TAS). The TAS had expanded to include fifteen schools by the mid 1990s and the standard of competition was falling. The colleges with the strongest athletic programs in the TAS competition's top division moved to form the AIC.

After the AIC was founded, only one all-boys school remained in TAS, the now defunct Marist Brothers College Rosalie. In protest of the departure of the eight AIC schools from TAS competition, all TAS schools with a primary school attached withdrew from the Combined Independent Colleges (CIC) association for private primary schools in 1998. Six of the Associated Independent Colleges were foundation members of the CIC.

The Combined Independent Colleges association was dissolved in 2013. Primary schools attached to AIC schools had previously competed against their Great Public Schools (GPS) counterparts within the CIC, but the headmasters of the GPS and AIC associations expanded their respective competitions in 2014 to include primary students from grades 5–7.

Schools

Starting in 2022, Ambrose Treacy College, Indooroopilly was invited to become a guest member for a two-year time span.

Sports
There are currently ten sports officially contested within the AIC:

 Athletics (track and field)
 Basketball
 Cricket
 Chess
 Cross country running

 Football (soccer)
 Rugby union
 Swimming
 Tennis
 Volleyball

Four other sports are also offered: 

 Australian rules football
 Golf

 Rugby league
 Water polo

Water polo is played as a social competition in Term 4. An invitational golf day is also held in Term 4, with the annual Gordon Balharry Shield awarded to the AIC school with the best team score on an adjusted handicap basis. Rugby league and Australian rules football competitions were introduced on a two-year opt-in trial basis for 2019.

Ashgrove, Iona and St Laurence's have traditionally been prominent in the rugby competitions, although Padua has enjoyed recent success. St Peters, Villanova and Padua have tended to field strong soccer teams. St Patrick's has had success in cross country and Ashgrove and Iona have won the most titles in athletics and swimming.

The sporting calendar for the AIC is split into terms:

 1st: Australian football  Cricket  Volleyball Swimming
 2nd: Chess  Football  Rugby union
 3rd: Basketball  Cross country  Rugby league  Tennis
 4th: Athletics  Golf  Water polo

The championships for swimming, cross country, track and field athletics and golf are held on a single day. The other sports are played in a round-robin format (no finals) with each school playing all others once. Premierships in each grade, for age divisions from under 13 to open, are won by the teams with most points over the season. The premierships for the schools' first teams in each sport, particularly the First XV rugby, tend to attract the most interest.

Championships

Athletics (track and field)
Winning teams on aggregate points for all age groups:

Championships – Ashgrove (12), Iona (9), St Edmund's (3).

Cross Country
Winning teams on aggregate points for all age groups:

Championships – Ashgrove (12), Iona (8), St Patrick's (5), St Laurence's (2).

 indicates shared championship.

Swimming
Winning teams on aggregate points for all age groups:

Championships – Ashgrove (13), St Peters (10), Iona (2).

 indicates shared championship.

Premierships

First XV Rugby
List of First XV premiers and runners-up:

Premierships - Ashgrove (14), St Laurence's (5), Iona (4), Padua (3), St Peters (2), St Edmund's (2), St Patrick's (1), Villanova (1).

Notes:
* indicates undefeated season.
 indicates shared premiership for the year.

First XI Cricket
List of First XI premiers and runners-up:

Premierships - Ashgrove (9), Iona (8), Villanova (6), St Laurence's (2), St Patrick's (2), Padua (1).

* indicates undefeated season.
 indicates shared premiership for the year.

First XI Football
List of First XI premiers and runners-up:

Premierships - Ashgrove (10), Villanova (5), Iona (3), St Patrick's (3), St Laurence's (3), Padua (2), St Edmund's (1), St Peters (1).

* indicates undefeated season.
 indicates shared premiership for the year.

First VI Volleyball
List of First VI premiers and runners-up:

Premierships - Ashgrove (6), St Edmund's (5), St Peters (3), Villanova (4), Padua (3), St Laurence's (3), Iona (2), St Patrick's (1).

* indicates undefeated season.

 indicates shared premiership for the year.

First V Basketball
List of First V premiers:

Premierships - Ashgrove (10), Villanova (7), Iona (4), St Edmund's (4), Padua (3), St Laurence's (1), St Patrick's (1), St Peters (1).

* indicates undefeated season.
 indicates shared premiership for the year.

First IV Tennis
List of First IV premiers:

Premierships - St Peters (9), Ashgrove (6), Villanova (5), Iona (1), Padua (1), St Edmund's (1), St Patrick's (1), St Laurence's (1)

* indicates undefeated season.
 indicates shared premiership for the year.

First IV Chess
The AIC chess competition began in 2004. List of First IV premiers:

Premierships - Padua (5), St Laurence's (5), Ashgrove (4), Villanova (3), St Peters (3), St Edmund's (2), Iona (1).

 indicates shared premiership for the year.

Other sports

First XVIII Australian football
The AIC competition was introduced on a trial opt-in basis for 2019. List of Open team winners:

Notes:
 indicates shared premiership for the year.

First XIII Rugby league
The AIC competition was introduced on a trial opt-in basis for 2019. List of Open team winners:

 indicates shared premiership for the year.

Golf
Teams of up to five compete for the Gordon Balharry Shield. List of Open team winners since 2011:

Water polo
Water polo is played as a social competition on an opt-in basis by AIC schools.

Other events
Aside from athletic competitions, the AIC has formed a community with many other interactions. Member schools participate in the QDU debating competition, various mission and social justice events, the Queensland Catholic Colleges Music Festival (QCMF) and other social functions.

As all AIC schools are of Christian denomination, an Ecumenical service is hosted each year by one of the schools on a rotational basis. It is attended by staff and student leaders representing each school.

See also
 List of schools in Queensland

Notes

References

External links
 aicsport.com.au official website

Colleges

 Iona College
 Marist College Ashgrove
 Padua College
 St Edmund's College

 St Laurence's College
 St Patrick's College
 St Peters Lutheran College
 Villanova College

Australian school sports associations